Regole per i padroni (Egnglish: Rules for landowners) is a work from Florentine writer Marco Lastri, first published in 1793.

Summary

Rules for Landowners 
The first section of the work explains useful tips that landowners must follow to maximize their profits.

They must carefully select the farmers who will work the land and ensure that the number of family members is not too high or too low and can provide the right amount of work.

Landowners must pay their farmers' expenses in the periods of the year when the weather does not permit farming, to maintain motivation and health.

Employers must invest in tools to help the farmers.

Advice for farmers 
Lastri underlines the importance of a house's cleanliness. He discusses handling of waste and clean water reservoirs. Farmers must not work when ill and must drink water during the working day. After some tips about diet, the author explains the importance of moderation and self-control to maintain health and serenity.

Mountains 
Mountains are much more suitable for pasture than cultivation. However, landowners have often exploited this type of land, depleting them even of their poor fertility.

Lastri thinks woods and mountain lands should be preserved for environmental, practical and economic reasons.

Potatoes 
This part is an interview of a landowner of Pistoia (a little city near Florence). The landowner explains his secrets to cultivate and cook potatoes.

Cane thickets 
Lastri explains why cane thickets are a useful type of cultivation. Cane thickets are cheap to cultivate and useful to sustain other plants. The work concludes after describing how to practically cultivate cane thickets.

Editions

First edition: Lastri, Marco, 1793, .

Second edition: Lastri, Marco, 1803, .

References

1793 books